Nela is a 2018 Sri Lankan Sinhala romance film directed and produced by Bennett Rathnayake for Benn Films. It stars Shalani Tharaka and Udara Rathnayake in lead roles along with Tharuka Wanniarachchi and Roshan Pilapitiya. Music composed by Suresh Maliyadde.

The story is based on novel Nela by Indrani Rathnasekara which is a translation from the original Spanish novel Marianela by Benito Pérez Galdós. Film screened on 54 cinema theatres of CEL Theatre Board. It is the 1296th Sri Lankan film in the Sinhala cinema.

Cast
 Shalani Tharaka as Nela
 Udara Rathnayake as George
 Tharuka Wanniarachchi as Isabella
 Roshan Pilapitiya as Charles
 Anura Dharmasiriwardena as De Souza, George's father
 Thumindu Dodantenna as Doctor
 Palitha Silva as Rengasamy
 Semini Iddamalgoda
 Udari Perera as Sundari, Nela's mother
 Thimothi O’reilly as Taylor
 Pramuditha Udayakumara as Saping

Songs

References

External links
 
 බෙනට්ගේ ‘නෙලා’ ප්‍රදර්ශනයේ
 නෙලා නොගත් අස්වැන්න

2010s Sinhala-language films